This is a list of odd-toed ungulate species by estimated global population. This list misses data on Tapirus terrestris, which has not yet been estimated.

See also

Lists of mammals by population
Lists of organisms by population

References

Mammals
ungulates
Odd-toed ungulates